Shri Maharaja Hari Singh, commonly known as SMHS Hospital or Hedwun Hospital, is the multi-speciality state-owned hospital in Karan Nagar area of Srinagar.

History 
C.M.Hadow was an Austrian merchant and philanthropist. He came to Kashmir during the era of Ranbir Singh, probably around 1888 to do carpet trade. He started his own carpet weaving company C.H.Hadow And Co. ( Proprietor C M Hadow )and by his dedication, this company turned out to number one company of that era rather bigger than ” East India carpet factory .

Viceroy of India Marquess Linlithgow requested C.M. Hedow to donate his estate for construction of the first state hospital. Viceroy of India, the Marquess of Linlithgow, visited Kashmir in 1940 and foundation of State hospital at the estate of the Hadow Mills Carpet Factory. This is the reason according to Dr Ashraf Kashmir, this hospital was casually known as Hadwun (Hadow’s) Hospital til this day. Another viceroy of India, Lord Wavell came to Kashmir in 1945 to inaugurate the hospital, he inaugurated it, on 11 October 1945. Dr. A. Mitra was selected as its first Chief Medical Officer. He later served as Public Works Minister on the Maharajah's State Council.  C.M  Hedow expired in 1945 in Kashmir only, his business was taken over by his son K.C.Nedou. K.C. Nedou was later on expelled from Kashmir in 1948. K.C.Hadow and his wife retired to Victoria, British Columbia, where he died in 1978.

n 1959, Government Medical College was also established on the same campus giving the medical students opportunity to examine the patients of the hospital during their undergraduate and post graduate courses to gain experience and practical knowledge. The students of the college under proper supervision visit the hospital for the treatment of patients. During the September 2014 floods, the hospital was damaged and people suffered enormously due to scarcity of medic facilities.

The ophthalmology department at the SMHS Hospital has treated more than a thousand pellet gun victims of Indian police shootings, from July 2016 till June 2018. They are treated in the hospital’s four operating theaters, as well as a trauma theater in the emergency department.

Further reading 
BIBLIOGRAPHY:
Brown, David J. 1981. 111,3:219.
Carpets from the Hadow Factory in Kashmir.” Hali.
Jammu and Kashmir state archives, order of Maharaja, 30 August 1911, file no.55\E-3 ) https://mega.nz/file/pvxFxbrL#bHhrc2ijb3n4ARAjVLc_e-GQ0wkfFBvZ88https://mega.nz/file/pvxFxbrL#bHhrc2ijb3n4ARAjVLc_e-GQ0wkfFBvZ88-QVfb8vss
Pandit chitralakha Zutshi, (Kashmir, history, politics, and representation ) pp. 39.

See also
SKIMS

References

Hospitals in Jammu and Kashmir